John Brian Moore (born March 31, 1958) is an American former professional basketball player. Moore played college basketball for The University of Texas at Austin under head coaches Leon Black and Abe Lemons from 1975 to 1979. He spent his entire NBA career playing point guard for the San Antonio Spurs, save one game for the New Jersey Nets. A rare illness caused Moore to have his career put on hold in early 1986.

College career
Moore started all 112 games of his four-year college career at Texas. He finished his career as Texas' all-time career assists leader, with 714, and remains second all-time in assists per game, averaging 6.38 assists over the course of his four years as the Longhorns' point guard. His per-game average of 8.34 assists as a senior remains a UT men's basketball record. Moore also posted a double-figure scoring average in each of his four seasons. He received first-team All-Southwest Conference (SWC) honors following his senior season.

As a junior, Moore helped guide the Abe Lemons-coached 1977–78 Longhorns basketball team to a 26–5 overall record (then tied with Jack Gray's 1947 Final Four team for the most wins in a single season in school history), a share of the Southwest Conference championship, and the 1978 National Invitation Tournament championship. The following season, Moore helped Texas win a share of the SWC championship for the second consecutive year, defeat a school-record three AP-ranked teams, advance to the 1979 NCAA Tournament as a No. 4 seed, and finish the season with an overall record of 21–8, giving the Longhorns their first back-to-back seasons of 20 or more wins in 31 years.

NBA career
Moore was selected by the Seattle SuperSonics in the second round of the 1979 NBA draft as the 43rd overall pick, then the second-highest NBA draft position for any basketball player in UT history.

Over 520 games in his NBA career, Moore averaged 9.4 points, 7.4 assists, 3.0 rebounds and 1.96 steals per game, and a field goal percentage of 46.0.

Moore recorded 20 assists during three games in his career, once during the playoffs, making him one of only seven players to record 20 assists or more in a playoff game. He also had two games of nine or more steals in a game, being one of only 50 different players to record nine or more steals in a game.

Moore is one of ten players to have his number ("00") retired by the Spurs.

NBA career statistics

Regular season

|-
| style="text-align:left;"|
| style="text-align:left;"|San Antonio
| 82 ||  || 19.2 || .479 || .053 || .610 || 2.4 || 4.5 || 1.5 || .3 || 7.4
|-
| style="text-align:left;"|
| style="text-align:left;"|San Antonio
| 79 || 78 || 29.0 || .463 || .048 || .670 || 3.5 ||style="background:#cfecec;"|9.6* || 2.1 || .2 || 9.4
|-
| style="text-align:left;"|
| style="text-align:left;"|San Antonio
| 77 || 73 || 33.1 || .468 || .227 || .744 || 3.6 || 9.8 || 2.5 || .4 || 12.2
|-
| style="text-align:left;"|
| style="text-align:left;"|San Antonio
| 59 || 42 || 28.0 || .446 || .322 || .755 || 3.0 || 9.6 || 2.1 || .3 || 10.1
|-
| style="text-align:left;"|
| style="text-align:left;"|San Antonio
| 82 || 82 || 32.8 || .457 || .281 || .762 || 4.6 || 10.0 || 2.8 || .2 || 12.8
|-
| style="text-align:left;"|
| style="text-align:left;"|San Antonio
| 28 || 23 || 30.6 || .495 || .182 || .686 || 3.1 || 9.0 || 2.5 || .2 || 13.0
|-
| style="text-align:left;"|
| style="text-align:left;"|San Antonio
| 55 || 27 || 22.4 || .442 || .278 || .800 || 1.8 || 4.5 || 1.5 || .1 || 8.6
|-
| style="text-align:left;"|
| style="text-align:left;"|San Antonio
| 4 || 0 || 12.8 || .444 || .000 ||  || 1.0 || 2.8 || .8 || .0 || 2.0
|-
| style="text-align:left;"|
| style="text-align:left;"|New Jersey
| 1 || 0 || 10.0 || .000 ||  ||  || 2.0 || 1.0 || .0 || .0 || .0
|-
| style="text-align:left;"|
| style="text-align:left;"|San Antonio
| 53 || 8 || 9.7 || .373 || .235 || .593 || 1.0 || 1.5 || .6 || .1 || 2.2
|- class="sortbottom"
| style="text-align:center;" colspan="2"|Career
| 520 || 333 || 25.8 || .460 || .251 || .712 || 3.0 || 7.4 || 2.0 || .2 || 9.4

Playoffs

|-
| style="text-align:left;"|1981
| style="text-align:left;"|San Antonio
| 7 ||  || 17.7 || .486 || .000 || .750 || 1.9 || 3.9 || 1.4 || .1 || 6.0
|-
| style="text-align:left;"|1982
| style="text-align:left;"|San Antonio
| 9 ||  || 32.4 || .476 || .000 || .593 || 3.4 || style="background:#cfecec;"|10.3* || 1.7 || 0.7 || 10.4
|-
| style="text-align:left;"|1983
| style="text-align:left;"|San Antonio
| 11 ||  || 37.6 || .533 || style="background:#cfecec;"|.529* || .800||4.3||style="background:#cfecec;"|14.6* || style="background:#cfecec;"|2.5* || .3 || 22.5
|-
| style="text-align:left;"|1985
| style="text-align:left;"|San Antonio
| 5 || 5 || 33.6 || .463 || .333 || .652 || 6.0 || 8.4 || 2.0 || .4 || 13.2
|-
| style="text-align:left;"|1990
| style="text-align:left;"|San Antonio
| 9 || 0 || 9.6 || .250 || .000 || .500 || 1.2 || 2.3 || .8 || .1 || 1.8
|- class="sortbottom"
| style="text-align:center;" colspan="2"|Career
| 41 || 5 || 26.4 || .490 || .313 || .683 || 3.2 || 8.4 || 1.7 || .3 || 11.3

Coaching career
Moore made his coaching debut in the 2010–11 season with the Austin Toros of the NBA D-League as an assistant coach.

In December 2012 Moore was named head coach of the Corpus Christi Clutch of the American Basketball League. 10 of 12 teams did not survive the first ABL season of 2013, including the Clutch.

In the Fall of 2013 Moore was named head coach the South Texas Stingrays, an expansion team in the ABA. Team majority owner Marlon Minifee (who also owns the Texas Fuel) decided not to bring back the Stingrays to Brownsville for 2014–15, opting to form a new team: Central Texas Swarm (now known as the Am-Mex Swarm). Moore is currently head coach of the Swarm.

See also
 List of National Basketball Association players with most steals in a game
 List of National Basketball Association players with most assists in a game

References

External links

1958 births
Living people
20th-century African-American sportspeople
21st-century African-American people
African-American basketball players
American expatriate basketball people in Spain
American men's basketball players
Basketball coaches from Pennsylvania
Basketball players from Pennsylvania
CB Girona players
Liga ACB players
National Basketball Association players with retired numbers
New Jersey Nets players
Point guards
San Antonio Spurs players
Sportspeople from Altoona, Pennsylvania
Texas Longhorns men's basketball players